Atul Satish Wassan  (born 23 March 1968) is a former Indian cricketer. After retirement, he has become a cricket commentator. He played four Tests and nine One Day Internationals for India, however due to injuries his career was cut short and he became a television pundit.

Atul Wasan is an alumnus of Guru Harkrishan Public School in Vasant Vihar, Delhi and was recognized for his cricketing talent at school.

References

External links

1968 births
Living people
Indian cricketers
Delhi cricketers
India One Day International cricketers
India Test cricketers
North Zone cricketers
Indian cricket commentators